Unthank is a hamlet in the North East Derbyshire district of Derbyshire, England.

On 6 May 1970, a USAF McDonnell-Douglas RF-4C crashed in the nearby Stripes Wood while doing a NATO training exercise. Both crew men ejected and landed at Curbar Edge.

References

External links

Hamlets in Derbyshire
North East Derbyshire District